Vidar Hanssen is the founder of Beatservice Records, a record label for electronic music based in Tromsø, Norway.

Hanssen is also involved in the Insomnia Festival.

References

Musicians from Tromsø
Living people
Year of birth missing (living people)
Place of birth missing (living people)